Midwestern State University (MSU Texas) is a public liberal arts university in Wichita Falls, Texas. In 2020 it had 5,141 undergraduate students. It is the state's only public institution focused on the liberal arts.

History
Founded in 1922 as Wichita Falls Junior College, it was renamed Hardin Junior College in 1937 when it moved to its present location off Taft Boulevard. In 1946, a senior division was added and it was renamed Hardin College. In January 1950, the name changed to Midwestern University, with the junior college division remaining Hardin Junior College. In March 1948, the university became a member of the Association of Colleges and Secondary Schools. In January 1959, the university added a graduate school which received full approval from the State Board of Education in August of that year.

A further change in the school's status came September 1, 1961, when by action of the 56th session of the Texas State Legislature, Midwestern University became part of the Texas Colleges and Universities System and the junior college division was dissolved. In 1975, the Texas Legislature changed the name to Midwestern State University.

From its beginnings as a municipal junior college housed in a high school building, Midwestern has become a state university whose campus of 255 acres and 70 buildings offers a wide variety of academic programs in liberal and fine arts, mathematics, sciences, business, and applied sciences.

On March 9, 2015, the university announced that Suzanne Shipley was selected to become its next president, following Jesse Rogers' retirement after 48 years of service to the school.

On December 13, 2016, the university broke ground on a new campus in Flower Mound, Texas. The two-story facility shares space with North Central Texas College and opened in June 2018.

The Robert and Carol Gunn College of Health Sciences and Human Services officially opened up their new building, Centennial Hall, on September 6, 2019.

On August 6, 2020, the Texas Tech University System and Midwestern State University agreed to a memorandum of understanding to begin the process of MSU Texas becoming the fifth university to join the system. The process was completed on September 1, 2021, when HB 1522 went into effect.

Academics

Midwestern State University is organized into seven colleges with 16 undergraduate programs offering 43 majors and 30 minors, and 9 graduate programs offering 28 majors and 15 minors.

MSU is the only university in Texas with membership in the Council of Public Liberal Arts Colleges and was the first public university in Texas to establish a core curriculum. The university is also a member of the Association of American Colleges and Universities and the Association for Core Texts and Courses.

Dalquest Desert Research Station 
The Dalquest Desert Research Station is located on 3,000 acres of West Texas soil north of the Big Bend Ranch State Park. The land was a gift from the late Dr. Walter W. Dalquest, a professor at MSU, and his wife, Rose, on the condition that it be used for scientific research by biologists and geologists. Today, the site is used by professors, students, naturalists, scientists, and educators.

Athletics

Midwestern State fields 13 intercollegiate NCAA Division II athletic teams. MSU is a member of the Lone Star Conference (LSC). The school mascot is the mustang.

The basketball and volleyball teams play at D.L. Ligon Coliseum. The football team plays at Memorial Stadium (Wichita Falls). The soccer teams play at the MSU Soccer Field. The softball team plays at Mustangs Park. The tennis teams play at the MSU Tennis Center.

Student life

Students can be members of 14 nationally affiliated fraternities and sororities. Sororities on campus include Kappa Delta Chi, Sigma Kappa, Chi Omega, Gamma Phi Beta, Alpha Phi, Kappa Delta Chi, Alpha Kappa Alpha, Delta Sigma Theta, and Sigma Lambda Alpha. Fraternities are Tau Kappa Epsilon, Sigma Nu, Sigma Alpha Epsilon, Omega Delta Phi, Kappa Sigma, and Kappa Alpha Order.

More than 100 other student organizations are on campus, such as the Association for Computing Machinery, the Fellowship of Christian Athletes, several musical organizations, and sports clubs such as MSU Rugby.

The campus has a newspaper, The Wichitan, and a student-run television channel and production studio, M&G Media. The campus newspaper and production studio are housed in the Mass Communication wing of the Fain Fine Arts Center.

Housing and dining services 
Midwestern State has four residence halls; Legacy Hall, McCullough-Trigg Hall, Killingsworth Hall, and Pierce Hall (the latter of which is currently vacated for construction). It also has two apartments; Sundance Courts and Sunwatcher Village.

Dining services went through a major remodel in 2016, adding new storefronts. Dining halls include the Mesquite Dining Hall and Maverick's Corner. New storefronts in the Clark Student Center include Chick-fil-A & ACE Sushi. Einstein Bros. Bagels is located in the Dillard College of Business Administration. A cafe called Campus Coffee was opened at the Bridwell Activities Center (built in 2021 and completed in 2022) in 2022.

Notable alumni

Arts and entertainment 
Phil McGraw — Dr. Phil, television host
Jaret Reddick — original founder and lead vocalist/guitarist of the popular punk band Bowling for Soup
JoAnne Worley — Laugh In and many other TV comedy shows

Athletics 
Marqui Christian — NFL safety
Eric Dawson — professional basketball player
Chad DeGrenier — AFL player
Cotton Fitzsimmons - American college and NBA basketball coach
Jinh Yu Frey — professional Mixed Martial Artist, current Invicta FC Atomweight Champion
Bryan Gilmore — NFL wide receiver
Andrea Hannos — professional cyclist
Dudley Meredith — NFL defensive end
Tony Pesznecker — professional soccer player
Will Pettis — Arena Football Hall of Fame player
Dominic Rhodes — NFL running back
Amini Silatolu — NFL offensive tackle
Chad Smith — professional soccer player (Charlotte Eagles (USL))
Ray Gene Smith — NFL safety
Gary Suiter — NBA center
Craig Sutherland — professional soccer player
Andy Tanner — professional football player
Bryce Taylor — professional soccer player
J. J. Unga — NFL offensive guard
Randy Waldrum — women's head soccer coach of the Houston Dash (2014-2017)
Daniel Woolard — Professional soccer player for D.C. United

Business and nonprofit 
Albert Buckman Wharton III — former owner of the Waggoner Ranch

Government 
Lanham Lyne — mayor of Wichita Falls, Texas, 2005–2010; state representative, District 69, (2011-2013)
Andy King — council member for the 12th District of the New York City Council (2012–present)
Dan Kubiak — state representative from Rockdale, (1969–1983 and 1991–1998)
Mark Boulware — U.S. ambassador to Mauritania (2007–2010)
Walter Wilson Jenkins — American political figure and longtime top aide to U.S. President Lyndon B. Johnson

Journalism and literature 
John Edwards Williams — American writer
Beck Weathers — motivational speaker and a mountain climber involved in the 1996 Everest disaster

Religion 
Stephen McNallen — American white supremacist and proponent of Heathenry

Science and education 
Dr. Mark Puder — professor of surgery, Harvard Medical School
Mark Rippetoe — author, strength-training coach
Dr. Michael K. Obeng, celebrity plastic surgeon in Beverly Hills, CA
Dr. David Hunter - Texas Rangers, Team Physician

Notable faculty lecturers and staff
John Tower — United States Senator
Larry McMurtry — American novelist
Nathan Jun — American political philosopher

Controversies 
Since 2018 several incidents of racially-motivated vandalism and harassment have been reported at Midwestern State University.  The university administration has been repeatedly criticized by students of color for its handling of such incidents, as well as for its perceived indifference to issues facing racial minorities more generally.
In 2018 the Midwestern State University faced widespread criticism from students in response to the administration's perceived indifference to sexual harassment and violence on campus. A university administrator reportedly made a rape joke at a campus forum intended to discuss the issue.
In 2019 a Midwestern State University graduate student was publicly outed as  a white supremacist. The university was roundly criticized for its handling of the ensuing controversy.
In 2020 Midwestern State University was widely and publicly criticized for its response to a right-wing harassment campaign that had been directed against former philosophy professor Nathan Jun in response to controversial Facebook posts. The following year the university was again criticized for allegedly forcing Jun to resign his tenured position by denying him a requested disability accommodation. The allegation prompted an open letter of protest  that was eventually signed by more than 500 faculty members.

References

External links

 
 Midwestern State Athletics website

 
Public universities and colleges in Texas
Liberal arts colleges in Texas
Universities and colleges accredited by the Southern Association of Colleges and Schools
Education in Wichita Falls, Texas
Buildings and structures in Wichita Falls, Texas
1922 establishments in Texas
Educational institutions established in 1922
Public liberal arts colleges in the United States
Texas Tech University System